Neoregelia leucophoea is a species of flowering plant in the Bromeliaceae family. It is endemic to Brazil.

References

leucophoea
Flora of Brazil
Taxa named by John Gilbert Baker
Taxa named by Lyman Bradford Smith